Mark Lawn (born August 1960) was the Bradford City chairman along with Julian Rhodes from 2007 to 2016. In June 2007, he loaned the club the money to pay off debts to the banks, taking on the debt himself.

After the club's historic cup run in 2012/2013 season the club repaid Mark Lawn his loan with substantial interest resulting in the club unable to pay for any players. More recently he has fallen out with the current owners and has subsequently been banned from Valley Parade.

He has been a Bradford City fan for more than 40 years since he was a young child.

Lawn co-founded business Driver Hire, in Bingley, in 1983. He expanded the business into a nationwide firm with more than 100 outlets before he sold his share in 1999.

References

1960 births
Living people
Bradford City A.F.C. directors and chairmen